The Seaward 24 is an American trailerable sailboat that was designed by Nick Hake as a cruiser and first built in 1984.

Production
The design was built by Hake Yachts in the United States, starting in 1984, but it is now out of production.

Design
The Seaward 24 is a recreational keelboat, built predominantly of fiberglass, with wood trim. It has a fractional sloop rig, a plumb stem, a slightly angled transom, a transom-hung rudder controlled by a tiller and a fixed stub keel with a retractable centerboard. It displaces  and carries  of lead ballast.

The boat is normally fitted with a small  outboard motor for docking and maneuvering.

The design has sleeping accommodation for five people, with a double "V"-berth in the bow cabin, a straight settee berth in the main cabin plus a convertible double berth on the port side. The galley is located on the port side just forward of the companionway ladder. The galley is equipped with a two-burner stove, an icebox and a sink, with a refrigerator optional. The head is located just aft of the bow cabin on the starboard side.

For sailing the design may be equipped with a jib, storm jib or 150% genoa.

Operational history
In a 2010 review Steve Henkel wrote, "... the accommodations plan of the Seaward 24 shows both a gimballed stove with oven and space for a refrigerator (though ... a refrigerator is somewhat impractical on an outboard powered sailboat because of the electrical drain on the batteries, which would require many hours of charging with the noise and smell of a running engine). Best features: Her relatively low freeboard and springy sheer give the Seaward 24 a sleek and salty look, as if she is ready for whatever challenges the sea might bring to her. She is well-built to boot, and with her generous sailplan and long waterline for her size has a better than even chance of satisfying the requirements of experienced sailors. Worst features: None noted."

See also
List of sailing boat types

References

External links
Photo of a Seaward 24

Keelboats
1980s sailboat type designs
Sailing yachts 
Trailer sailers
Sailboat type designs by Nick Hake
Sailboat types built by Hake Yachts